Eve Franklin is a registered nurse, and was a Democratic Party member of the Montana Senate, representing Great Falls from 1991 through 2002. Starting in 2003, Franklin served in the Montana House of Representatives, through 2007. She then served as a state mental health ombudsman and Governor Brian Schweitzer's Health Policy Advisor.

Notes

External links
Follow the Money - Eve Franklin
2006 2004 2002 1998 1994 1990 campaign contributions

Democratic Party members of the Montana House of Representatives
Living people
Women state legislators in Montana
Year of birth missing (living people)
21st-century American women